Gasparo Pratoneri, nicknamed "Spirito da Reggio" (fl. 1556–59) was an Italian priest, and composer of the Renaissance based at San Prospero in Reggio Emilia. He was musical tutor to the nobleman composer Alfonso Fontanelli.

Pratoneri is often confused with his contemporary, the more famous "Hoste da Reggio," Bartolomeo Torresano, whose works sometimes appeared after his death named as "Spirito L'Hoste", even though this name was not used during his lifetime.

References

16th-century Italian composers
Italian classical composers
Italian male classical composers
16th-century Italian Roman Catholic priests
Year of birth unknown
Year of death unknown